Bodo Kox (born April 22, 1977, Wrocław, Poland, birth name: Bartosz Koszała), is a Polish film director, actor, and screenwriter, known for award-winning feature films The Girl from the Wardrobe (2013) and The Man with the Magic Box (2017).

He officially changed his name to Bodo Kox in 2006.

Filmography

Director, screenwriter
 Silverman, 2004, independent, short, comedy
 Marco P. i złodzieje rowerów, 2005, independent, short, comedy
 Sobowtór, 2006, independent, full feature
 Nie panikuj!, 2007, independent, full feature
 The Girl from the Wardrobe, 2013, mainstream, comedy drama
 The Man with the Magic Box, 2017, mainstream, science fiction, dystopian film

Awards
2017: Awards for film The Man with the Magic Box
2015: Special recognition of the ScripTeast contest for the best screenplay from Central and Eastern Europe at the Cannes Film Festival, for The Man with the Magic Box
2013: Awards for film The Girl from the Wardrobe
A number of independent film awards (2005, 2006) and nominations ("OFFskar" awards) as an actor and screenwriter

References

External links

1997 births
Living people
Media Wave Award winners
Polish film directors
Polish screenwriters
Polish male film actors
Film people from Wrocław